Marionetas (English title:Marionettes) is a Mexican telenovela produced by Eugenio Cobo for Televisa in 1986. It is an original story of María Antonieta Saavedra and directed by Miguel Córcega.

Alma Delfina, Ana Silvia Garza and Jéssica Jurado starred as protagonists.

Plot
Laura, Magdalena and Alejandra are three young men who come to Mexico City to study their college careers. Upon meeting, form a kind of family to support each other. Magdalena studying medicine. It is the most focused of the three, and that creates the balance between extreme personalities Alejandra and Laura. He meets and falls in love with Gustavo. Eventually they marry.

Alejandra studying law. It is the most rational and analytical of the three, and sometimes becomes hard and intolerant. Luis marries and has children, but over the years, he is unfaithful. Luis tries to reconcile with Alejandra, but she does not accept his apology. In the end, Magdalena asks if never forgive Luis and Alejandra responds that he can not say 'never', but you doubt it, because when they married promised never hurt, and that did not happen.

Laura is the most open and generous of the three, but also the most disappointment suffered. He falls for Jorge, but he is unfaithful and marries a woman of money, the daughter of his boss. Years later fall in love again, this time from Francisco, a married man. This forbidden romance makes distance itself from Alejandra and Laura who, as married women, can not understand that her friend is a "rompehogares" and willing to be the other woman.

After being separated, Francisco and Laura are seeing. He does not come to the appointment and she believes have deceived again. Two days later, Laura is visited by the daughter of Francisco, who reveals that he had a heart attack the day I had an appointment. Also note that, before dying, asked him to go see Laura to tell who was the love of his life.

Concerned depression Laura, Magdalena and Alejandra will see it, and make up with her. The three friends are together again.

Cast 
Alma Delfina as Laura Contreras
Ana Silvia Garza as Magdalena Santacruz
Jéssica Jurado as Alejandra Valencia
Lucero Lander as Mariana
Martha Navarro as Sofía
Azucena Rodríguez as Leonor
Fernando Ciangherotti as Gustavo Almada
Mapita Cortés as Adriana Gallardo
Luis Couturier as Marcelo
Ernesto Laguardia as Sergio
Manuel López Ochoa as Francisco Mallén
Isaura Espinoza as Elvira García
Luis Gatica as Jorge Linares
Juan Felipe Preciado as Alfredo
David Ostrosky as Luis

Awards

References

External links

1986 telenovelas
Mexican telenovelas
1986 Mexican television series debuts
1986 Mexican television series endings
Spanish-language telenovelas
Television shows set in Mexico City
Televisa telenovelas